The Goolwa Barrages comprise five barrage structures in the channels separating Lake Alexandrina from the sea at the mouth of the River Murray and the Coorong in South Australia. They were constructed principally to reduce salinity levels in the lower reaches of the River Murray, Lake Alexandrina and Lake Albert, but also to stabilise the river level, for both upstream irrigation and pumping.

History 

From the 1900s, with the advent of large irrigation schemes, landowners along the lower reaches of the river strongly urged for the construction of barrages, primarily to keep the water fresh in the lower reaches of the River Murray, as well as Lake Albert and Lake Alexandrina.

In 1931, the Murray-Darling Basin Commission authorised the construction of five barrages. Work commenced in 1935 and was completed in 1940. South Australia's Engineering and Water Supply Department undertook the project, with costs shared equally by the governments of South Australia, Victoria, New South Wales and the Commonwealth of Australia.

Description

The system consists of five barrages extending from Sir Richard Peninsula in the west to Pelican Point on the northern side of the mouth of the Coorong in the east, crossing five channels between the mainland and three islands. From west to east, the five barrages are named Goolwa, Mundoo, Boundary Creek, Ewe Island and Tauwitchere.

Goolwa Barrage
The Goolwa Barrage connects Sir Richard Peninsula on the mainland  with Hindmarsh Island . This barrage includes a lock, which measures 30.5 m by 6.1 m.

Mundoo Barrage
The Mundoo Barrage connects Hindmarsh Island with Mundoo Island.

Boundary Creek Barrage
The Boundary Creek Barrage connects Mundoo Island with Ewe Island.

Ewe Island Barrage
The Ewe Island Barrage connects Ewe Island with Tauwitchere Island.

Tauwitchere Barrage
The Tauwitchere Barrage connects Tauwitchere Island with Pelican Point on the mainland. The lock in this barrage, provided for fishing boats, measures 13.7 m by 3.8 m.

Engineering heritage award 
The barrages are listed as a National Engineering Landmark by Engineers Australia as part of its Engineering Heritage Recognition Program.

See also
List of reservoirs and dams in Australia

References 

Dams in South Australia
Murray-Darling basin
Tidal barrages
Recipients of Engineers Australia engineering heritage markers